Jahazpur is a city and a municipality in Bhilwara district in the Indian state of Rajasthan.It is also the tehsil headquarters of the Jahazpur tehsil. It is commonly popular for a temple called Jain temple swastidham and built around a fort.

History

According to legend, the fort of Jahazpur was originally built by Samprati, grandson of the great Mauryan emperor Ashoka, who was a follower of Jainism. This fort used to protect the terrain of Hadoti Bundi and Mewar like a giridwar.  In the tenth century, Rana Kumbha rebuilt the fort of Jahazpur.

Jahazpur is an ancient town in Rajasthan near Bundi and Shahpura, towns of Bhilwara (polar coordinates: 25 ° 37'7 "N 75 ° 16'32" E), and the town of Deoli in Tonk district, . The ruins of several ancient Jain temples have been found at Jahazpur.  It is also a municipal and assembly constituency. This area is full of mineral wealth.

Geography
There is a Jain Mandir in the shape of a Jahaz (ship) being built there popularized as Atishay Kshetra dedicated to Bhagwan Munisuvrata Nath.The under construction temple is on the Jahazpur-Shahpura (Bhilwara) State Highway No. 39 which is around 24 km from Deoli,a town in the Tonk District of Rajasthan on the National Highway running from Jabalpur to Jaipur.

Demographics
 India census, Jahazpur had a population of 18,816. Males constitute 51% of the population and females 49%. Jahazpur has an average literacy rate of 59%, lower than the national average of 59.5%: male literacy is 72%, and female literacy is 45%. In Jahazpur,16% of the population is under 6 years of age.

Shri 1008 Munisuvratnath Jain Mandir 

Jahazpur along with Hasteda is known for its ancient idols of Munisuwartnath. The temple at Jahazpur and hasteda is dedicated to Munisuvrata the twentieth Tirthankara of Jainism. The Moolnayak idol at newly built the Jahaj (ship) shaped temple at Jahazpur  is a black-coloured idol of Munisuvrata Swami. This temple has been constructed with the inspiration of Shri 105 Swasti Bhushan Mataji. The idol is considered miraculous by Jains. 
The statue of Munisuvrat Nath was unearthed from the ground dug for the construction of a house in Jahazpur in 2013.

Shri 1008 Bhooteshwar Mahadev 
There is a historical temple of Hindu god Shiva in the village of Luhari-Kalan and is famous among the locals.

Jahazpur State

Jahazpur State was founded in 1572 by Jagmal Singh when he was denied the Kingship so he went to Mughal service and Emperor Akbar gifted him Jahazpur Jagir, he used Rao as his title; Jahazpur State existed until 1758, when the invading Maratha forces invaded the Jahazpur fort, forcing the rulers to shift to Anjar.

Raos of Jahazpur

 Rao Jagmal Singh (1572 – 1583) - (b. 1545 - d. 1583)
 Rao Vijay Singh (1583 – 1620) - (b. 1568 - d. 1620)
 Rao Prithviraj Singh (1620 – 1628) - (b. 1590 - d. 1628)
 Rao Gajraj Singh (1628 – 1660) - (b. 1615 - d. 1660)
 Rao Maandev (1660 – 1678) - (b. 1638 - d. 1678)
 Rao Surajdev (1678 – 1734) - (b. 1664 - d. 1734)
 Rao Shaktidev (1734 – 1738) - (b. 1688 - d. 1738)
 Rao Hamirji (1738 – 1758) - (b. 1708 - d. 1788)

References

External links 
 www.Jahazpur.com

Cities and towns in Bhilwara district